Millan Baçi (born 3 November 1955, in Albania) is a former Albanian football player.

Club career
He spent his entire career with 17 Nëntori Tirana. His main position was wing back, with the right wing as his favourite.

International career
Baçi made his debut for Albania in a November 1976 friendly match against Algeria and has earned a total of 7 caps, scoring 1 goal. He has represented his country in 5 FIFA World Cup qualification matches.

His final international was an October 1981 World Cup qualification match against Bulgaria.

Retirement
Now, he works in the youth department of the Albanian Football Association (F.SH.F). He is a notable personality in the football world and a football critic as well.

Honours
Albanian Superliga: 2
 1982, 1985

References

External links

1955 births
Living people
Footballers from Tirana
Albanian footballers
Association football fullbacks
Association football midfielders
Albania international footballers
KF Tirana players
Albanian football managers
KF Tirana managers